Talfita is a Syrian village in the Al-Tall District of the Rif Dimashq Governorate. According to the Syria Central Bureau of Statistics (CBS), Talfita had a population of 4,082 in the 2004 census. Its inhabitants are predominantly Sunni Muslims.

Climate
In Talfita, there is a Mediterranean climate. Rainfall is higher in winter than in summer. The Köppen-Geiger climate classification is Csc. About  of precipitation falls annually.

References

Bibliography

Populated places in Al-Tall District